The Kingsmen are a 1960s rock band from Portland, Oregon, United States. They are best known for their 1963 recording of R&B singer Richard Berry's "Louie Louie", which held the No. 2 spot on the Billboard charts for six weeks and has become an enduring classic.

In total, the Kingsmen charted 13 singles from 1963 to 1968 and five consecutive albums from 1963 to 1966.  Their first album, The Kingsmen in Person, remained on the Billboard Top LPs chart for 131 weeks from January 1964 to August 1966.  Their early albums were released internationally in Canada, the UK, France, Germany, Mexico, South Africa, and Taiwan.

Early years
Lynn Easton and Jack Ely started performing at an early age in local newspaper-sponsored reviews the Journal Juniors and the Young Oregonians, respectively. In 1957, they started performing together, with Ely singing and playing guitar and Easton on the drum kit. The two teenagers had grown up together, as their parents were close friends. Easton and Ely performed at local parties and events, and soon added Mike Mitchell on guitar and Bob Nordby on bass to round out the band. They called themselves the Kingsmen, taking the name from a recently disbanded group. The Kingsmen began their collective career playing at fashion shows, Red Cross events, and supermarket promotions, generally avoiding rock songs on their setlist. In 1962, Don Gallucci, a high school freshman at the time, was recruited from another local group, the Royal Notes, to play keyboards.

"Louie Louie"
In 1962, while playing a gig at the Pypo Club in Seaside, Oregon, the band noticed Rockin' Robin Roberts's version of "Louie Louie" being played on the jukebox for hours on end with the entire club dancing. Ely convinced the Kingsmen to learn the song, which they played at dances to a great crowd response. Unknown to him, he changed the beat because he misheard it on a jukebox. Ken Chase, host of radio station KISN, formed his own club to capitalize on these dance crazes. Dubbed "The Chase", the Kingsmen became the club's house band and Ken Chase became the band's manager. On April 5, 1963, Chase booked the band an hour-long session at the local Northwestern Inc. studio for the following day to record a demo tape for a summer cruise ship gig. Adding to the hurried atmosphere, the band had just played a 90-minute "Louie Louie" marathon the night before.

Despite the band's annoyance at having so little time to prepare, on April 6 at 10 am the Kingsmen walked into the three-microphone recording studio. "Jamaica Farewell", one partial and one full take of "Louie Louie", and "Haunted Castle" were recorded. For "Louie Louie", the only vocal number, Ely was forced to lean back and sing to a microphone suspended from the ceiling. "It was more yelling than singing", Ely said, cause I was trying to be heard over all the instruments." In addition, he was wearing braces at the time of the performance, further compounding his infamously slurred words. Ely sang the beginning of the third verse two bars too early but realized his mistake and waited for the rest of the band to catch up. The Kingsmen were not proud of the recording and wanted to fix their mistakes, but Chase liked the energy and rawness and assured them that the demo version could be redone before a record was released.

With a competing "Louie Louie" version from Paul Revere and the Raiders getting heavy play on a competing station, Chase began playing the Kingsmen's demo version on his show at KISN. He then contracted with Jerry Dennon's Jerden Records to press a single. The B-side was "Haunted Castle", composed by Ely and Don Gallucci, the new keyboardist; however, Lynn Easton was credited on both the Jerden and Wand releases.

"Louie Louie" reached No. 1 on the Cashbox and Music Vendor charts and No. 2 on the Billboard Hot 100 chart. Additionally it reached No. 1 on the CHUM Canada chart and in the UK it reached No. 26 on the Record Retailer chart. It sold over one million copies, and was awarded a gold disc.

The band attracted nationwide attention when "Louie Louie" was banned by the governor of Indiana, Matthew E. Welsh, also attracting the attention of the FBI because of alleged indecent lyrics in their version of the song. The lyrics were, in fact, innocent, but Ely's baffling enunciation permitted teenage fans and concerned parents alike to imagine the most scandalous obscenities. (Ironically, the FBI totally missed Lynn Easton yelling "Fuck!" at 0:54 after fumbling a drum fill.)  All of this attention only made the song more popular.  In April 1966 "Louie Louie" was reissued and once again hit the music charts, reaching No. 65 on the Cashbox chart and No. 97 on the Billboard Hot 100 chart.

In 1985, Ross Shafer, host and a writer-performer of the late-night comedy series Almost Live! on the Seattle TV station KING, spearheaded an effort to have "Louie Louie" replace "Washington, My Home" by Helen Davis as Washington's official state song. Picking up on this initially prankish effort, Whatcom County Councilman Craig Cole introduced Resolution No. 85–12 in the state legislature, citing the need for a "contemporary theme song that can be used to engender a sense of pride and community, and in the enhancement of tourism and economic development". His resolution also called for the creation of a new "Louie Louie County". While the House did not pass it, the Senate's Resolution 1985-37 declared April 12, 1985, "Louie Louie Day". A crowd of 4,000, estimated by press reports, convened at the state capitol that day for speeches, singalongs, and performances by the Wailers, the Kingsmen, and Paul Revere and the Raiders. Two days later, a Seattle event commemorated the occasion with the premiere performance of a new, Washington-centric version of the song written by composer Berry.

Over the years the Kingsmen's version of "Louie Louie" has been recognized by organizations and publications worldwide for its influence on the history of rock and roll.  Rankings and recognition in major publications and surveys are shown in the table below.

Kingsmen history

Before the success of "Louie Louie", the members of the Kingsmen took varied paths. Easton, whose mother had registered the name of the group and therefore owned it, declared that from this point on he intended to be the singer asserting, "It's my band because I own the name" (he and his mother had registered the name), and forcing Ely to play the drums. This led Ely and Nordby to quit the group in 1963, and Gary Abbott and Norm Sundholm were added to play drums and bass, respectively.

Don Gallucci was forced out because he wasn't old enough to tour and later formed Don and the Goodtimes, which morphed into the short-lived Touch. Later, Gallucci became a record producer with Elektra Records, with his most famous production being the Stooges' seminal second album Fun House.

The two remaining original Kingsmen, Lynn Easton and Mike Mitchell, were joined by Gary Abbott, Barry Curtis and Norm Sundholm to record their first album and tour as the official band.  Dick Peterson (not Dickie Peterson) replaced Gary Abbott shortly thereafter.  This line-up stayed intact from 1964 into 1966 and charted multiple singles and albums with Easton as the principal vocalist.

After Ely's departure and considerable chart success by the new line-up, the group learned that he was performing with another group as The Kingsmen. Following legal action, a settlement was reached and Easton, Mitchell, Peterson, Curtis and Sundholm established their rights to the "Kingsmen" name. Thus, Ely was forced to stop using the name, Easton could no longer lip sync to Ely's vocals, and subsequent releases of "Louie Louie" were required to have the text "Lead vocal by Jack Ely" below the title.  Unable to perform using the Kingsmen name, Ely continued with his groups the Squires and the Courtmen.  He also received a gold record for "Louie Louie" as part of the settlement.

The Kingsmen's 1964 follow up to "Louie Louie" was a party version of "Money (That's What I Want)" which hit the Billboard Hot 100 at No. 16 and on Cashbox at No. 17. Then came "Little Latin Lupe Lu" peaking on Billboard at No. 46 and Cashbox at No. 49. After that it was "Death of An Angel" No. 33 on Cashbox and No. 42 on Billboard.

After starting 1965 with their own float in the Rose Bowl Parade, the Kingsmen returned to the Top 10 nationally with "The Jolly Green Giant" reaching No. 4 on Billboard and No. 8 on Cashbox. The novelty number also made No. 25 on the Billboard R&B chart and hit No. 1 on the RPM Canada chart. The follow-up song was "The Climb", No. 45 on Cashbox and No. 65 on Billboard. "Annie Fanny" was released next reaching No. 43 on Cashbox and No. 47 on Billboard. Next came "(You Got) The Gamma Goochee", No. 98 on Cashbox and No. 122 on Billboard.  The group also appeared in the beach party movie How to Stuff a Wild Bikini singing "Give Her Lovin'" (released as a B-side to "Annie Fanny") which appeared on the soundtrack album along with their recording of the title song.

In 1966 the Kingsmen continued to hit the charts with "Killer Joe" reaching No. 77 on Billboard and No. 81 on Cashbox. Their original recording of "Louie Louie" was re-released as "Louie Louie 64-65-66" and re-entered the Billboard, Cash Box, and Record World charts. They also released a promotional item, a "picture-sleeve-clad potato-chip ad jingle 45" titled "The Krunch", their only picture sleeve single, which did not chart.

In 1967 they made the charts for the last time with "Bo Diddley Bach" reaching No. 128 on Billboard, and in July founding member Lynn Easton left the group. He worked for an advertising firm and hosted this is IT, a "bandstand-type" show for Portland television station KGW.

In late 1968 with the original group on a recording and touring hiatus, the Kingsmen's management team worked with the Kasenetz-Katz production organization and studio musicians to release a single on the Earth label ("Feed Me"/"Just A 'B' Side"). A separate lineup was formed with new members (including lead singer Yank Barry) to tour for a time during 1968–1969 on the East Coast of the United States while the main lineup of the band was inactive.

In 1973 the reactivated group signed with Capitol and released one single which did not chart.

In addition to Jack Ely's groups and re-recordings, several of the Kingsmen pursued other solo projects. Dick Peterson and Barry Curtis as the Other Two released two singles in 1966, and Lynn Easton re-recorded "The Jolly Green Giant" in 1976. Peterson as Dick St. Nicklaus released two albums, Magic (1979) and Sweet and Dandy (1980), and multiple singles.

In 1983, the group successfully sued K-tel over the release of the 1982 60's Dance Party album because it featured a 1976 Jack Ely re-recording of "Louie Louie" billed as by "The Kingsmen" and displayed the text "These selections are rerecordings by the original artists" on the back cover. K-tel had also similarly marketed the Lynn Easton re-recording of "The Jolly Green Giant".

In 1993, members of the group brought legal action against Gusto Records to have all of their original recordings returned. Gusto had acquired the Kingsmen song rights from Springboard International Records, Inc., who had purchased the entire Scepter-Wand catalog in 1977 after Florence Greenberg's retirement, but the group had not been paid royalties since 1968. In 1998, the Kingsmen were awarded ownership of all their early recordings, including "Louie Louie".

Mike Mitchell died on April 16, 2021, on his 77th birthday. At the time of his death, he was the only remaining member of the Kingsmen's original lineup who still performed with the band. His "Louie Louie" guitar break has been called "iconic", "blistering", and "one of the most famous guitar solos of all time". Guitar Player magazine noted, "Raw, lightning-fast, and loud, the solo's unbridled energy helped make the song a No. 2 pop hit, but also helped set the template for garage-rock – and later hard-rock – guitar."

Members

Current 
Dick Peterson – drums, vocals (1963–present)
Steve Peterson – guitar, vocals (1988–present)
Kim Nicklaus – keyboards (1982–1984, 2000–present)
Todd McPherson – bass, guitar, vocals (1992–present)
Dennis Mitchell – guitar, vocals (2006–present)
Marc Willett – bass (1984–1992), (2021–present)

Former 
Mike Mitchell – vocals, guitar (1959–2021; died 2021)
Lynn Easton – vocals, drums, saxophone (1959–1967; died 2020)
Jack Ely – vocals, guitar (1959–1963; died 2015)
Bob Nordby – bass (1959–1963)
Don Gallucci – keyboards (1962–1963)
Gary Abbott – drums (1963; died 2015)
Norm Sundholm – bass (1963–1967)
Barry Curtis – keyboards, guitar (1963–2005)
Kerry Magness – bass (1966–1967; died 2004)
J.C. Rieck – keyboards, vocals (1966–1967; died 2019)
Turley Richards – vocals, guitar (1967)
Pete Borg – bass (1967; died 2010)
Jeff Beals – bass (1967–1968); died 2016
Steve Friedson – keyboards (1967–1973)
Yank Barry – vocals (1968–1969)
Fred Dennis – bass (1972–1984)
Andy Parypa – bass (1982–1984)

Timeline

Discography
U.S. albums and singles, plus major compilation releases and appearances on 1960s various artist compilations.

Studio albums
Listed in chronological order with peak chart positions (Billboard/Cashbox) noted.
The Kingsmen in Person (Wand WDM/WDS-657) 1963 (#20/#16) 
The Kingsmen Volume II (Wand WDM/WDS-659) 1964 (#15/#20) 
The Kingsmen Volume 3 (Wand WDM/WDS-662) 1965 (#22/#10) 
The Kingsmen on Campus (Wand WDM/WDS-670) 1965 (#68/#53) 
15 Great Hits (Wand WDM/WDS-674) 1966 (#87/–) 
Up and Away (Wand WDM/WDS-675) 1966

Live albums 

 Plugged (Kingsmen CD 1) 1995 
 Garage Sale (Louie Louie Records) 2003

Releases of earlier material 

 Louie Louie – Live & Unreleased (Jerden 7004) recorded 1963, released 1992 
Since We've Been Gone (Sundazed 6027) recorded 1967, released 1994 
Live At The Castle (digital only) recorded 1964, released 2011

Compilation albums
The Kingsmen Greatest Hits (Wand WDM/WDS-681) 1967
The Best of the Kingsmen (Scepter/Citation Series CTN-18002) 1972
A Quarter to Three (Picc-A-Dilly PIC-3329) 1980 
Ya Ya (Picc-A-Dilly PIC-3330) 1980 
House Party (Picc-A-Dilly PIC-3346) 1980 
The Kingsmen Greatest Hits (Picc-A-Dilly PIC-3348) 1981 
The Best of the Kingsmen (Rhino RNLP 126) 1985
Rock & Roll – Kingsmen (Starday N5-2125) 1985
Louie Louie – The Kingsmen (Prime Cuts 1322) 1986
The Kingsmen – 12 Greatest (Golden Circle CS 57582) 198?
The Kingsmen – Louie, Louie (Golden Circle GC57881) 1987
The Jolly Green Giant (Richmond 2125) 1988
The Kingsmen – Louie Louie (Highland Music/Richmond 2138) 1988
The Best of the Kingsmen (Rhino 70745) 1989
The Kingsmen – Louie Louie and More Golden Classics (Collectables 5073) 1991
The Kingsmen – 20 Greats (Highland Music/Festival FST FCD 4417) 1991
The World of the Kingsmen/Louie Louie (Trace 0400612) 1992
Louie Louie 1994
The Best of the Kingsmen (Laserlight/Delta 124 24) 1995
The Very Best of the Kingsmen (Varèse Sarabande/Varèse Vintage 5905) 1998
The Kingsmen's Greatest Hits (K-tel K4185-2) 1998
Louie Louie: The Very Best of the Kingsmen (Collectables 5628) 1999
The Kingsmen – America's Premier 60s Garage Band (Edel America 70172) 2000
The Kingsmen – Gold (N'Dagroove Records NDA5331) 2012
The Kingsmen – Louie Louie and Other Great Hits (digital only) 2021

Singles

Appearances (1960s releases) 
Original Great Northwest Hits, Volume 1 (Jerden JRL 7001, 1964) – "Louie Louie"
Original Great Northwest Hits, Volume 2 (Jerden JRL 7002, 1964) – "J.A.J."
The Groups are the Greatest – The Greatest of the Groups (Scepter 518, 1964) – "Louie Louie", "Money", "Bent Scepter"
Murray The K – The Fifth Beatle Gives You Their Golden Gassers (Scepter 524, 1964) – "Louie Louie", "Money"
The Greatest on Stage (Wand 661, 1965) – "David's Mood", "Money", "Louie Louie"
How to Stuff a Wild Bikini soundtrack (Wand 671, 1965) – "Give Her Lovin'", "How to Stuff a Wild Bikini" 
The Hitmakers (Jerden JRL 7005, 1965) – "Twist and Shout", "All the Little Animals" 
KHJ Boss Goldens, Volume 1 (Original Sound KHJ 9365, 1965) – "The Jolly Green Giant"
Wolfman's Favorite Oldies (Scepter 564, 1967) – "Louie Louie", "Killer Joe"
Battle of the Bands, Volume 2 (Panorama 109, 1967) – "C.C. Rider"
보칼 넘버원! 제1집, (Daedo Records EU-138, 1968) – "Louie Louie" 

Discography notes

Other uses of the name
Prior to this group's formation, another group called The Kingsmen operated in 1958 and was made up of members of Bill Haley & His Comets who were moonlighting from their regular work with Haley. This group scored a hit record (#35) on Billboard with the instrumental entitled "Week End", written by Rudy Pompilli, Franny Beecher, and Billy Williamson, backed with "Better Believe It" as the B side. They released a follow-up single on East West Records featuring "The Catwalk" backed with "Conga Rock". Although the Comets did the actual recordings, when the Kingsmen went on tour a different set of musicians performed instead of Haley's people. The band made at least one appearance on American Bandstand in 1958.

Many other groups have used the name "The Kingsmen", including a gospel vocal group formed in 1956 (also referred to as The Kingsmen Quartet), and bands that were later renamed as Flamin' Groovies, The Gants and The Statler Brothers. An a cappella group at Columbia University is traditionally known as the Kingsmen; former members include Art Garfunkel and the original lineup of Sha Na Na.

Further reading

 Ace Records (UK); 'Love that Louie' CD sleevenotes.
 Rhino Records; 'The Best of Louie Louie' CD sleevenotes.
 Renaissance Records; 'Touch' CD sleevenotes.

References

External links
 Official Kingsmen webpage
 
 
 The Kingsmen at Northwest Music Archives

 
Musical groups established in 1959
Garage rock groups from Oregon
Musical groups from Portland, Oregon
1959 establishments in Oregon
Wand Records artists